The Colorado Amphitheater (Zypher Amphitheater), also known as Structure #41, is a natural stone amphitheater built in 1935 to serve Camp George West of the Colorado National Guard.  It is located near the base of South Table Mountain, a mesa located just east of Golden, Colorado.

Built under the auspices of commander Neil West Kimball, grandson of the general for whom the camp was named, it was constructed as a project of the Works Progress Administration.  One of its primary uses in operation was to show films to the Guard troops.  However, the amphitheater fell into disuse when rattlesnakes became too plentiful for comfort.  The amphitheater later came into ownership by the National Renewable Energy Laboratory.

It was listed on the National Register of Historic Places in 1993.

See also
National Register of Historic Places listings in Jefferson County, Colorado

References

External links
Golden Landmarks Association

Buildings and structures in Golden, Colorado
Theatres on the National Register of Historic Places in Colorado
Works Progress Administration in Colorado
Military facilities on the National Register of Historic Places in Colorado
National Register of Historic Places in Jefferson County, Colorado
Event venues on the National Register of Historic Places in Colorado